The Macomb Orchard Trail is a 23.5 mile long rail trail in Macomb County, Michigan.  It is built on the right-of-way of an early Michigan railroad, the Michigan Air Line Railway, later owned and operated by Canadian National Railway. The trail stretches from Richmond to Dequindre Road, where it connects to the Clinton River Trail.

The Macomb Orchard Trail is owned and maintained by Macomb County.

References

External links
 Friends of the Macomb Orchard Trail

Protected areas of Macomb County, Michigan
Rail trails in Michigan